Bangladesh participated in the 1994 Asian Games which were held from October 2 to October 16, 1994, in Hiroshima, Japan.

Medalists

Boxing

Men

Field hockey

Men

Group B

Classification 5th–8th

7th place match

 Bangladesh ranked 7th in the field hockey.

Kabaddi

All times are Japan Standard Time (UTC+09:00)

See also
 Bangladesh at the Asian Games
 Bangladesh at the Olympics

References

Nations at the 1994 Asian Games
1994
Asian Games